Marol Naka (Officially, TECNO Marol Naka) is a metro station on Line 1 of the Mumbai Metro serving the Marol neighbourhood of Andheri in Mumbai, India. It was opened to the public on 8 June 2014.

Upon the metro line being commissioned for passengers, the BEST launched a special bus service Metro Pheri 1 which brings commuters from a distance to the closest of the 3 metro stations it serves. It runs from SEEPZ and via the B crossroad arrives at Chakala (J.B.Nagar) metro station then runs parallel to the metro line alongside Andheri Kurla Road touching Airport Road metro station and Marol Naka metro station then via Marol Maroshi Road back to SEEPZ.

History

Station layout

Facilities

List of available ATM at Marol Naka metro station are: Kotak Mahindra Bank
List of food outlets available : Jumbo King

Connections
The station will be an interchange station between Lines 1 and 3 of the Metro once the latter is commissioned.

Exits

See also
Public transport in Mumbai
List of Mumbai Metro stations
List of rapid transit systems in India
List of Metro Systems

References

External links

The official site of Mumbai Metro
 UrbanRail.Net – descriptions of all metro systems in the world, each with a schematic map showing all stations.

Mumbai Metro stations
Railway stations in India opened in 2014
2014 establishments in Maharashtra